World Cup Italia '90 is a football video game by Sega for Mega Drive in 1990 and Master System  in 1991. The Mega Drive version is the European release of World Championship Soccer. The Master System version was released in Brazil as Super Futebol II.

Summary
Only the Master System game gives official groups, teams and the fidelity schedule of the championship. Gameplay occurs at a bird's-eye view and sees the player given the choice of participating as any of the teams that featured in the tournament itself (excluding the Republic of Ireland), and no qualifying tournaments to reach the World Cup are available on this game.

The Mega Drive version was later renamed to Sega Soccer on the Mega 6 compilation cartridge removing the Virgin Mastertronic credits.

In Brazil, the Master System version was released as a Master System exclusive with the name Super Futebol II. Super Futebol had been the name used in Brazil for World Championship Soccer.

Official license
Virgin Mastertronic owned the home license for the official video game of the 1990 World Cup. This was used on their self-developed games for home computers under the title World Cup Soccer: Italia '90. They also published Sega games in Europe so used the licence for the different games for the Sega consoles.

This is the second licensed game based on the FIFA World Cup featuring the official logo and the mascot, the first having been the ill-fated World Cup Carnival for the 1986 FIFA World Cup.

Playable nations

A 24 countries were able to be played on the game. They are:
  
  
  
  
  
  
  
  
  
  
  
  
  
  
  
  
  
  
  
  
  
  
  
  

Not all these teams qualified for the real life 1990 FIFA World Cup.

Reception

Mega placed the game at #5 in their list of the 10 Worst Mega Drive Games of All Time, and awarded a score of 40%.

See also
There are other unofficial Italia '90 games: Italy 1990, Italy '90 Soccer and Italia 1990.

References

External links
Fan page

Video Game
1990 video games
Association football video games
Master System games
Sega Genesis games
Sports video games set in Italy
FIFA World Cup video games
Video games set in 1990
Video games developed in Japan